When Love Sets the Fashion (German: Wenn die Liebe Mode macht) is a 1932 German comedy film directed by Franz Wenzler and starring Renate Müller, Hubert von Meyerinck and Georg Alexander. It was shot at the Babelsberg Studios of UFA in Potsdam. The film's sets were designed by the art director Julius von Borsody.

Synopsis
A seamstress is able to rise to become the dressmaker at a fashion house and successfully saves the business of an investor by making her design ideas the latest fashion.

Cast

References

Bibliography 
 Hake, Sabine. Popular Cinema of the Third Reich. University of Texas Press, 2001.

External links 
 

1932 films
Films of the Weimar Republic
German comedy films
1932 comedy films
1930s German-language films
Films directed by Franz Wenzler
German black-and-white films
UFA GmbH films
1930s German films
Films shot at Babelsberg Studios